U.S. Bicycle Route 50 (USBR 50) is a planned east–west cross country U.S. Bicycle Route that currently consists of two discontiguous sections: a western section between San Francisco and Border, Utah, and an eastern section between Terre Haute, Indiana, and Washington, D.C.

Route description

|-
| CA || 
|-
| NV || 
|-
| IN || 
|-
| OH || 
|-
| WV || 
|-
| PA || 
|-
| MD || 
|-
| DC || 
|- class="sortbottom"
! scope="row" | Total || 
|}

California
USBR 50 begins in San Francisco. It incorporates a ferry ride across the San Francisco Bay, the Jedediah Smith Memorial Trail in Sacramento County, the El Dorado Trail in El Dorado County, and the Mormon Emigrant Trail before reaching South Lake Tahoe.

Nevada
Near the eastern terminus is a junction with State Route 487, which leads to U.S. Bicycle Route 79 at the Utah state line near Garrison, Utah. It passes near Great Basin National Park.

Indiana
After a large gap in the Midwestern United States, USBR 50 traverses eight counties in Indiana, from the Illinois state line just outside Terre Haute to the Ohio state line outside Richmond. The route through Indiana roughly parallels the Historic National Road (U.S. Route 40), except for a bypass to the south of Indianapolis. USBR 50 briefly joins U.S. Bicycle Route 35 in New Palestine.

Ohio
USBR 50 continues through Ohio, traversing 11 counties to the Market Street Bridge that connects Steubenville and Follansbee, West Virginia.

The route through Ohio incorporates a number of rail trails. From west to east, it follows the Wolf Creek Recreation Trail, Great Miami River Recreation Trail, Mad River Recreation Trail, Creekside Trail, Little Miami Scenic Trail, Prairie Grass Trail, Roberts Pass, Camp Chase Trail, Scioto Greenway Trail, Alum Creek Greenway Trail, Thomas J. Evans Trail, and Panhandle Trail. USBR 50 also runs along state and U.S. routes, especially in the more rugged terrain east of Newark. In Xenia, USBR 50 shares a short segment of the Little Miami trail with State Bike Route 3. From Xenia to Columbus, it shares the Prairie Grass, Roberts Pass, and Camp Chase trails local segments the Ohio to Erie Trail with U.S. Bicycle Route 21 and State Bike Route 1.

West Virginia
This is in the Northern Panhandle of West Virginia.  The route begins at the Market Street Bridge at its crossing the Ohio River at connects to the Panhandle Trail and continues on into Pennsylvania.

Pennsylvania
USBR 50 mostly follows the Panhandle and Montour Trails and the Great Allegheny Passage as it crosses five counties to connect Colliers, West Virginia, with Frostburg, Maryland. From West Newton to Rockwood, it shares the Great Allegheny Passage with BicyclePA Route S.

Maryland and Washington, D.C.

From the Pennsylvania state line near Frostburg, USBR 50 continues along the Great Allegheny Passage and then follows the Chesapeake & Ohio Canal Towpath to the Georgetown neighborhood of Washington, D.C. U.S. Bicycle Route 11 currently terminates at USBR 50 in Brunswick, Maryland.  After crossing the Washington, D.C. line, the Arizona Avenue Bridge, carrying the Capital Crescent Trail, eventually passes over USBR 50, after which the final three miles of the route run close and parallel to the Capital Crescent Trail. U.S. Bicycle Route 1 is accessible close to the terminus of USBR 50 south of the Potomac River in Virginia.

History
The first segment of USBR 50, incorporating the length of the C&O Canal Towpath in Maryland, was approved by the American Association of State Highway and Transportation Officials (AASHTO) on October 23, 2013. On May 29, 2014, AASHTO approved additional segments in Ohio and Washington, D.C., including the remaining  of the C&O Towpath. On September 25, 2015, AASHTO approved the route through Indiana, as well as an alternate route in the Columbus, Ohio, area that had been part of Ohio's original route proposal. USBR 50 signs were posted along the Ohio segment in the summer of 2016. AASHTO approved the  route across Pennsylvania in 2017 and the  route across Nevada the following year. AASHTO also approved a 2018 realignment of USBR 50 in Ohio, trimming  from the route, passing through Hopedale and bypassing Alexandria. In the Fall 2018, AASHTO approved a realignment within London, Ohio, adding  to the route.  AASHTO approved the route across West Virginia at their Fall 2019 meeting.

Auxiliary routes

U.S. Bicycle Route 50A

U.S. Bicycle Route 50A (USBR 50A) is an alternate route through Delaware and Licking counties northeast of Columbus, Ohio. During planning for USBR 50 in Ohio, this route was proposed as a scenic route. However, it was omitted from the USBR 50 proposal approved by AASHTO in 2013. USBR 50A was later approved by AASHTO in 2015. The route extends from Westerville to Alexandria over various local roads as well as the Thomas J. Evans Trail, Hoover Scenic Trail, and Genoa Township Trail (part of the Ohio to Erie Trail).

See also
 American Discovery Trail, a long-distance hiking trail with similar endpoints

References

External links

 U.S. Bicycle Route 50 in Ohio, Ohio Department of Transportation

50
Bike paths in California
Bike paths in Indiana
Bike paths in Ohio
Bike paths in Maryland
Bike paths in Nevada
Bike paths in Pennsylvania
Bike paths in Washington, D.C.
Bike paths in West Virginia
2013 establishments in the United States
2013 establishments in Maryland
2014 establishments in Ohio
2014 establishments in Washington, D.C.
2015 establishments in Indiana
2017 establishments in Pennsylvania
2018 establishments in Nevada
2019 establishments in West Virginia
2020 establishments in California